Mayflower was an English ship that transported a group of English families, known today as the Pilgrims, from England to the New World in 1620.

Differing from their contemporaries, the Puritans (who sought to reform and purify the Church of England), the Pilgrims chose to separate themselves from the Church of England because they believed it was beyond redemption due to its Roman Catholic past and the church's resistance to reform, which forced them to pray in private. Starting in 1608, a group of English families left England for the Netherlands, where they could worship freely. By 1620, the community determined to cross the Atlantic for America, which they considered a "new Promised Land", where they would establish Plymouth Colony.

The Pilgrims had originally hoped to reach America by early October using two ships, but delays and complications meant they could use only one, Mayflower. Arriving in November, they had to survive unprepared through a harsh winter. As a result, only half of the original Pilgrims survived the first winter at Plymouth. If not for the help of local indigenous peoples to teach them food gathering and other survival skills, all of the colonists might have perished. The following year, those 53 who survived, celebrated the colony's first fall harvest along with 90 Wampanoag Native American people, an occasion declared in centuries later the first American Thanksgiving. Before disembarking the Mayflower, the Pilgrims wrote and signed the Mayflower Compact, an agreement that established a rudimentary government, in which each member would contribute to the safety and welfare of the planned settlement. As one of the earliest colonial vessels, the ship has become a cultural icon in the history of the United States.

Motivations for the voyage 

A congregation of approximately 400 English Protestants living in exile in Leiden, Holland, were dissatisfied with the failure of the Church of England to reform what they felt were many excesses and abuses. But rather than work for change in England (as other Puritans did), they chose to live as Separatists in religiously tolerant Holland in 1608. As separatists, they were considered illegal radicals by their home country of England.

The government of Leiden was recognized for offering financial aid to reformed churches, whether English, French or German, which made it a sought-after destination for Protestant intellectuals. Many of the separatists were illegal members of a church in Nottinghamshire, England, secretly practicing their Puritan form of Protestantism. When they learned that the authorities were aware of their congregation, church members fled in the night with little more than the clothes they were wearing, and clandestinely made it to Holland.

Life in Holland became increasingly difficult for the congregation. They were forced into menial and backbreaking jobs, such as cleaning wool, which led to a variety of health afflictions. In addition, a number of the country's leading theologians began engaging in open debates which led to civil unrest, instilling the fear that Spain might again place Holland's population under siege, as it had done years earlier. England's James I subsequently formed an alliance with Holland against Spain, with a condition outlawing independent English church congregations in Holland. In aggregate, these became the separatists' motivating factors to sail for the New World, which would have the added benefit of being beyond the reach of King James and his bishops.

Their desire to travel to America was considered audacious and risky, as previous attempts to settle in North America had failed. Jamestown, founded in 1607, saw most of its settlers die within the first year. 440 of the 500 new arrivals died of starvation during the first six months of winter. The Puritan separatists also learned of the constant threat of attacks by indigenous peoples. But despite all the arguments against traveling to this new land, their conviction that God wanted them to go held sway: "We verily believe and trust the Lord is with us," they wrote, "and that he will graciously prosper our indeavours, according to the simplicity of our hearts therein."

Voyage

Leaving Holland 

After deciding to leave Holland, they planned to cross the Atlantic using two purchased ships. A small ship with the name Speedwell would first carry them from Leiden to England. The larger Mayflower would then be used to transport most of the passengers and supplies the rest of the way.

Not all of the Separatists were able to depart, as many did not have enough time to settle their affairs and their budgets were too meager to buy the necessary travel supplies. The congregation therefore decided that the younger and stronger members should go first, with others possibly following in the future. Although the congregation had been led by John Robinson, who first proposed the idea of emigrating to America, he chose to remain in Leiden to care for those who could not make the voyage.

In explaining to his congregation why they should emigrate, Robinson used the analogy of the ancient Israelites leaving Babylon to escape bondage by returning to Jerusalem, where they would build their temple. "The Pilgrims and Puritans actually referred to themselves as God's New Israel," writes Peter Marshall. It was therefore considered the destiny of the Pilgrims and Puritans to similarly build a "spiritual Jerusalem" in America.

When it was time to leave, the ship's senior leader, Edward Winslow, described the scene of families being separated at the departure: "A flood of tears was poured out. Those not sailing accompanied us to the ship, but were not able to speak to one another for the abundance of sorrow before parting." William Bradford, another leader who would be the second governor of the Plymouth Colony, similarly described the departure:

From there, the Pilgrims first laid eyes on their larger ship, Mayflower, as it was being loaded with provisions.

Speedwell and Mayflower

Carrying about 65 passengers, Mayflower left London in mid-July 1620. The ship then proceeded down the Thames to the south coast of England, where it anchored at Southampton, Hampshire. There she waited for the planned rendezvous on July 22 with the Speedwell, coming from Holland with members of the Leiden congregation. Although both ships planned to depart for America by the end of July, a leak was discovered on Speedwell, which had to be repaired.

The ships set sail for America around August 5, but Speedwell sprang another leak shortly after, which necessitated the ships' return to Dartmouth for repairs. They made a new start after the repairs, but more than 200 miles (320 km) beyond Land's End at the southwestern tip of England, Speedwell sprang a third leak. It was now early September, and they had no choice but to abandon Speedwell and make a determination on her passengers. This was a dire event, as vital funds had been wasted on the ship, which were considered very important to the future success of their settlement in America. Both ships returned to Plymouth, England, where 20 Speedwell passengers joined the now overcrowded Mayflower, while the others returned to Holland.

They waited for seven more days until the wind picked up. William Bradford was especially worried: "We lie here waiting for as fair a wind as can blow... Our victuals will be half eaten up, I think, before we go from the coast of England; and, if our voyage last long, we shall not have a month's victuals when we come in the country." According to Bradford, Speedwell was refitted and seaworthy, having "made many voyages... to the great profit of her owners." He suggested that Speedwells master may have used "cunning and deceit" to abort the voyage by causing the leaks, fearing starvation and death in America.

Mayflower sets sail

In early September, western gales turned the North Atlantic into a dangerous place to sail. Mayflowers provisions were already quite low when departing Southampton, and they became lower still by delays of more than a month. The passengers had been on board the ship this entire time, feeling worn out and in no condition for a very taxing, lengthy Atlantic journey cooped up in the cramped spaces of a small ship.

At about 180 tons, she was considered a smaller cargo ship, having traveled mainly between England and Bordeaux with clothing and wine, not an ocean ship. Nor was she in good shape, as she was sold for scrap four years after her Atlantic voyage. She was a high-built craft forward and aft, measuring approximately 100 feet (30 m) in length and about 25 feet (7.6 m) at her widest point.

The trip across the Atlantic 

The living quarters for the 102 passengers were cramped, with the living area about 80 feet by 20 feet (1,600 sq. feet) and the ceiling about five feet high. With couples and children packed closely together for a trip lasting two months, a great deal of trust and confidence was required among everyone aboard.

John Carver, one of the leaders on the ship, often inspired the Pilgrims with a "sense of earthly grandeur and divine purpose". He was later called the "Moses of the Pilgrims", notes historian Jon Meacham. The Pilgrims "believed they had a covenant like the Jewish people of old", writes author Rebecca Fraser. "America was the new Promised Land." In a similar vein, early American writer James Russell Lowell stated, "Next to the fugitives whom Moses led out of Egypt, the little shipload of outcasts who landed at Plymouth are destined to influence the future of the world."

The first half of the voyage proceeded over calm seas and under pleasant skies. Then the weather changed, with continuous northeasterly storms hurling themselves against the ship, and huge waves constantly crashing against the topside deck. In the midst of one storm, the servant of physician Samuel Fuller died and was buried at sea. A baby was also born, christened Oceanus Hopkins. During another storm, so fierce that the sails could not be used, the ship was forced to drift without hoisting its sails for days, or else risk losing her masts. The storm washed a male passenger, John Howland, overboard. He had sunk about  until a crew member threw out a rope, which Howland managed to grab, and he was safely pulled back on board.

The passengers were forced to crouch in semi-darkness below deck. With waves tossing the boat in different directions, men held onto their wives, who themselves held onto their children. Water was soaking everyone and everything above and below deck.

In mid-ocean, the ship came close to being totally disabled and may have had to return to England or risk sinking. A storm had so badly damaged its main beam that even the sailors despaired. By a stroke of luck, one of the colonists had a metal jackscrew that he had purchased in Holland to help in the construction of the new settler homes. They used it to secure the beam, which kept it from cracking further, thus maintaining the seaworthiness of the vessel. All told, despite the crowding, unsanitary conditions and sea sicknesses, there was only one fatality during the voyage.

The ship's cargo included many stores that supplied the Pilgrims with the essentials needed for their journey and future lives. It is assumed that they carried tools, food and weapons, as well as some live animals, including dogs, sheep, goats, and poultry. The ship also held two small  boats powered by oars or sails. There were also artillery pieces aboard, which they might need to defend themselves against enemy European forces or indigenous tribes.

Arrival in America

On , they sighted present-day Cape Cod. They spent several days trying to sail south to their planned destination of the Colony of Virginia, where they had obtained permission to settle from the Company of Merchant Adventurers.

It was before setting anchor that the male Pilgrims and non-Pilgrim passengers (whom members of the congregation referred to as "Strangers") drew up and signed the Mayflower Compact. Among the resolutions in the Compact were those establishing legal order and meant to quell increasing strife within the ranks. Myles Standish was selected to make sure the rules were obeyed, as there was a consensus that discipline would need to be enforced to ensure the survival of the planned colony. Once they agreed to settle and build a self-governing community, they came ashore.

The moment the Pilgrims stepped ashore was described by William Bradford, the second Governor of the Plymouth Colony:

First winter

On Monday, an exploring expedition was launched under the direction of Capt. Christopher Jones to search for a suitable settlement site. There were 34 persons in the open small boat: 24 passengers and 10 sailors. They were ill-prepared for the bitter winter weather which they encountered on their reconnoiter, as the Pilgrims were not accustomed to winter weather which was much colder than back home. They were forced to spend the night ashore due to the bad weather they encountered, ill-clad in below-freezing temperatures with wet shoes and stockings that froze overnight. Bradford wrote, "Some of our people that are dead took the original of their death here" on the expedition.

Plymouth faced many difficulties during its first winter, the most notable being the risk of starvation and the lack of suitable shelter. The Pilgrims had no way of knowing that the ground would be frozen by the middle of November, making it impossible to do any planting. Nor were they prepared for the snow storms that would make the countryside impassable without snowshoes. And in their haste to leave, they did not think to bring any fishing rods.

From the beginning, the assistance they received from the local Native Americans was vital. One colonist's journal reported, "We dug and found some more corn, two or three baskets full, and a bag of beans. ... In all we had about ten bushels, which will be enough for seed. It is with God's help that we found this corn, for how else could we have done it, without meeting some Indians who might trouble us." Governor Bradford held out hope:

During the winter, the passengers remained on board Mayflower, suffering an outbreak of a contagious disease described as a mixture of scurvy, pneumonia, and tuberculosis. After it was over, only 53 passengers remained—just over half; half of the crew died as well.

Historian Benson John Lossing described that first settlement:

Jones had originally planned to return to England as soon as the Pilgrims found a settlement site. But his crew members began to be ravaged by the same diseases that were felling the Pilgrims, and he realized that he had to remain in Plymouth Harbor "till he saw his men began to recover." As with the Pilgrims, her sailors had been decimated by disease. Jones had lost his boatswain, his gunner, three quartermasters, the cook, and more than a dozen sailors. Mayflower made excellent time on her voyage back to England. The westerly winds that had buffeted her on the initial voyage pushed her along on the return trip home.

Passengers

Some families traveled together, while some men came alone, leaving families in England and Leiden. More than a third of the passengers were Separatists who sought to break away from the established Church of England and create a society that incorporated their own religious ideals. Other passengers were hired hands, servants, or farmers recruited by London merchants, all originally destined for the Colony of Virginia.

The passengers mostly slept and lived in the low-ceilinged great cabins and on the main deck, which was 75 by 20 feet large (23 m × 6 m) at most. The cabins were thin-walled and extremely cramped, and the total area was 25 ft by 15 ft (7.6 m × 4.5 m) at its largest. Below decks, any person over five feet (150 cm) tall would be unable to stand up straight. The maximum possible space for each person would have been slightly less than the size of a modern-day single bed.

Passengers passed the time by reading by candlelight or playing cards and games. They consumed large amounts of alcohol such as beer with meals. This was known to be safer than water, which often came from polluted sources and caused disease. No cattle or beasts of draft or burden were brought on the journey, but there were pigs, goats, and poultry.

Mayflower ship history 
There were 26 vessels bearing the name Mayflower in the Port Books of England during the reign of James I (1603–1625); it is not known why the name was so popular. The identity of Captain Jones's Mayflower is based on records from her home port, her tonnage (est. 180–200 tons), and the master's name in 1620 in order to avoid confusion with the many other Mayflower ships. It is not known when and where Mayflower was built, although late records designate her as "of London". She was designated in the Port Books of 1609–11 as "of Harwich" in the county of Essex, coincidentally the birthplace of Mayflower master Christopher Jones about 1570.

Records dating from August 1609 note Christopher Jones as master and part owner of Mayflower when his ship was chartered for a voyage from London to Trondheim in Norway and back to London. The ship lost an anchor on her return due to bad weather, and she made short delivery of her cargo of herring. Litigation resulted, and this was still proceeding in 1612. According to records, the ship was twice on the Thames at London in 1613, once in July and again in October and November, and in 1616 she was on the Thames carrying a cargo of wine, which suggests that the ship had recently been on a voyage to France, Spain, Portugal, the Canaries, or some other wine-producing land. Jones sailed Mayflower cross-Channel, taking English woolens to France and bringing French wine back to London. He also transported hats, hemp, Spanish salt, hops, and vinegar to Norway, and he may have taken Mayflower whaling in the North Atlantic off Spitsbergen or sailed to Mediterranean ports.

After 1616, there is no further record which specifically relates to Jones's Mayflower until 1624. This is unusual for a ship trading to London, as it would not usually disappear from the records for such a long time. No Admiralty court document can be found relating to the pilgrim fathers' voyage of 1620, although this might be due to the unusual way in which the transfer of the pilgrims was arranged from Leyden to New England, or some of the records of the period might have been lost.

Jones was one of the owners of the ship by 1620, along with Christopher Nichols, Robert Child, and Thomas Short. It was from Child and Jones that Thomas Weston chartered her in the summer of 1620 to undertake the Pilgrim voyage. Weston had a significant role in Mayflower voyage due to his membership in the Company of Merchant Adventurers of London, and he eventually traveled to the Plymouth Colony himself.

Later history 
Three of Mayflowers owners applied to the Admiralty court for an appraisal of the ship on May 4, 1624, two years after Captain Jones' death in 1622; one of these applicants was Jones' widow Mrs. Josian (Joan) Jones. This appraisal probably was made to determine the valuation of the ship for the purpose of settling the estate of its late master. The appraisal was made by four mariners and shipwrights of Rotherhithe, home and burial place of Captain Jones, where Mayflower was apparently then lying in the Thames at London. The appraisement is extant and provides information on ship's gear on board at that time, as well as equipment such as muskets and other arms. The ship may have been laid up since Jones' death and allowed to get out of repair, as that is what the appraisal indicates. The vessel was valued at one hundred and twenty-eight pounds, eight shillings, and fourpence.

What finally became of Mayflower is an unsettled issue. Charles Edward Banks, an English historian of the Pilgrim ship, claims that the ship was finally broken up, with her timbers used in the construction of a barn at Jordans village in Buckinghamshire. Tradition claims that this barn still exists as the Mayflower Barn, located within the grounds of Old Jordan in South Buckinghamshire. In 1624, Thomas Russell supposedly added to part of a farmhouse already there with timbers from a ship, believed to be from the Pilgrim ship Mayflower, bought from a shipbreaker's yard in Rotherhithe. The well-preserved structure was a tourist attraction, receiving visitors each year from all over the world and particularly from America, but it is now privately owned and not open to the public.

Second Mayflower
Another ship called Mayflower made a voyage from London to Plymouth Colony in 1629 carrying 35 passengers, many from the Pilgrim congregation in Leiden that organized the first voyage. This was not the same ship that made the original voyage with the first settlers. The 1629 voyage began in May and reached Plymouth in August; this ship also made the crossing from England to America in 1630 (as part of the Winthrop Fleet), 1633, 1634, and 1639. It attempted the trip again in 1641, departing London in October of that year under master John Cole, with 140 passengers bound for Virginia. It never arrived. On October 18, 1642, a deposition was made in England regarding the loss.

Mayflower design and layout 
Mayflower was square-rigged with a beakhead bow and high, castle-like structures fore and aft that protected the crew and the main deck from the elements: designs that were typical of English merchant ships of the early 17th century. Her stern carried a 30-foot high, square aft-castle which made the ship difficult to sail close to the wind and not well suited against the North Atlantic's prevailing westerlies, especially in the fall and winter of 1620; the voyage from England to America took more than two months as a result. Mayflowers return trip to London in April–May 1621 took less than half that time, with the same strong winds now blowing in the direction of the voyage.

Mayflowers exact dimensions are not known, but she probably measured about 100 feet (30 m) from the beak of her prow to the tip of her stern superstructure, about 25 feet (7.6 m) at her widest point, and the bottom of her keel about 12 feet (3.6 m) below the waterline. William Bradford estimated that she had a cargo capacity of 180 tons, and surviving records indicate that she could carry 180 casks holding hundreds of gallons each. The general layout of the ship was as follows:
 Three masts: mizzen (aft), main (midship), and fore, and also a spritsail in the bow area
 Three primary levels: main deck, gun deck, and cargo hold

Aft on the main deck in the stern was the cabin for Master Christopher Jones, measuring about ten by seven feet (3 m × 2.1 m). Forward of that was the steerage room, which probably housed berths for the ship's officers and contained the ship's compass and whipstaff (tiller extension) for sailing control. Forward of the steerage room was the capstan, a vertical axle used to pull in ropes or cables. Far forward on the main deck, just aft of the bow, was the forecastle space where the ship's cook prepared meals for the crew; it may also have been where the sailors slept.

The poop deck was located on the ship's highest level above the stern on the aft castle and above Master Jones' cabin. On this deck stood the poop house, which was ordinarily a chart room or a cabin for the master's mates on most merchant ships, but it might have been used by the passengers on Mayflower, either for sleeping or cargo.

It was a dangerous place if there was conflict, as it had gun ports from which cannon would be run out to fire on the enemy. The gun room was in the stern area of the deck, to which passengers had no access because it was the storage space for gunpowder and ammunition. The gun room might also house a pair of stern chasers, small cannon used to fire from the ship's stern. Forward on the gun deck in the bow area was a windlass, similar in function to the steerage capstan, which was used to raise and lower the ship's main anchor. There were no stairs for the passengers on the gun deck to go up through the gratings to the main deck, which they could reach only by climbing a wooden or rope ladder.

Below the gun deck was the cargo hold where the passengers kept most of their food stores and other supplies, including most of their clothing and bedding. It stored the passengers' personal weapons and military equipment, such as armor, muskets, gunpowder and shot, swords, and bandoliers. It also stored all the tools that the Pilgrims would need, as well as all the equipment and utensils needed to prepare meals in the New World. Some Pilgrims loaded trade goods on board, including Isaac Allerton, William Mullins, and possibly others; these also most likely were stored in the cargo hold. There was no privy on Mayflower; passengers and crew had to fend for themselves in that regard. Gun deck passengers most likely used a bucket as a chamber pot, fixed to the deck or bulkhead to keep it from being jostled at sea.

Mayflower was heavily armed; her largest gun was a minion cannon which was brass, weighed about 1,200 pounds (545 kg), and could shoot a 3.5 pound (1.6 kg) cannonball almost a mile (1,600 m). She also had a saker cannon of about 800 pounds (360 kg), and two base cannons that weighed about 200 pounds (90 kg) and shot a 3 to 5 ounce ball (85–140 g). She carried at least ten pieces of ordnance on the port and starboard sides of her gun deck: seven cannons for long-range purposes, and three smaller guns often fired from the stern at close quarters that were filled with musket balls. Ship's Master Jones unloaded four of the pieces to help fortify Plymouth Colony.

Mayflower officers, crew, and others 

According to author Charles Banks, the officers and crew of Mayflower consisted of a captain, four mates, four quartermasters, surgeon, carpenter, cooper, cooks, boatswains, gunners, and about 36 men before the mast, making a total of about 50. The entire crew stayed with Mayflower in Plymouth through the winter of 1620–1621, and about half of them died during that time.

Legacy 

The Pilgrim ship Mayflower has a famous place in American history as a symbol of early European colonization of the future United States. As described by the European History channel:

The main record for the voyage of Mayflower and the disposition of the Plymouth Colony comes from the letters and journal of William Bradford, who was a guiding force and later the governor of the colony. His detailed record of the journey is one of the primary sources used by historians, and the most complete history of Plymouth Colony that was written by a Mayflower passenger.

The American national holiday, Thanksgiving, originated from the first Thanksgiving feast held by the Pilgrims in 1621, a prayer event and dinner to mark the first harvest of the Mayflower settlers.

The 300th Anniversary of Mayflowers Landing was commemorated in 1920 and early 1921 by celebrations throughout the United States and by countries in Europe. Delegations from England, Holland and Canada met in New York. The mayor of New York, John Francis Hylan, in his speech, said that the principles of the Pilgrim's Mayflower Compact were precursors to the United States Declaration of Independence. While American historian George Bancroft called it "the birth of constitutional liberty." Governor Calvin Coolidge similarly credited the forming of the Compact as an event of the greatest importance in American history:

With twenty Mayflower historical societies throughout the country, along with an unknown number of descendants, the celebration was expected to last during much of 1920. As a result of World War I ending a few years earlier, the original plan to hold a world's fair in its honor was canceled.

The government issued a Pilgrim Tercentenary half dollar, which portrays the ship on its reverse and passenger William Bradford on its obverse.

400th anniversary, 2020 
The 400th anniversary of Mayflowers landing took place in 2020. Organizations in the UK and US planned celebrations to mark the voyage. Festivities celebrating the anniversary took place in various places in New England. Other celebrations were planned in England and the Netherlands, where the Pilgrims were living in exile until their voyage, but the COVID-19 pandemic forced some plans to be put on hold.

Among some of the events to mark the anniversary was a crossing of the Atlantic by the Mayflower Autonomous Ship, without any persons aboard, which used an AI captain designed by IBM to self-navigate across the ocean. The Harwich Mayflower Heritage Centre hoped to build a replica of the ship at Harwich, England. Descendants of the Pilgrims looked for a "once-in-a-lifetime" experience to commemorate their ancestors.

A full-scale replica of the ship was burnt in Great Torrington in Devon on 28 August 2021, a year later than originally planned.

See also

 Billericay, where the Pilgrim Fathers met prior to the voyage
 Leigh-on-Sea, where Mayflower was outfitted
 Mayflower II, a replica of Mayflower in Plymouth, Massachusetts
 Mayflower Steps in Plymouth, site of the ship's final departure from England
 Mayflower: The Pilgrims' Adventure (1979)
 Pilgrims (Plymouth Colony)
 Plymouth Adventure (directed by Clarence Brown, 1952)
 Puritan migration to New England (1620–1640)
 Speedwell (1577 ship)

Explanatory notes

References

Further reading
 Ames, Azel; Bradford, William. History of the Mayflower Voyage and the Destiny of Its Passenger, Madison & Adams Press (2018), public domain (CC BY-SA 3.0) 
  (the only written account of the voyage)
 
 
 
 
  (originally published in 1918)
 Vandrei, Martha. "The Pilgrim's Progress", History Today (May 2020) 70#5 pp 28–41. Covers the historiography 1629 to 2020; online

External links

 Mayflower and Plymouth History
 Mayflower 400
 Women of The Mayflower and Plymouth Colony by Mary Soule Googins, read before the Medford Historical Society, December 19, 1921
 Pilgrim Hall Museum of Plymouth, Massachusetts
 General Society of Mayflower Descendants
 The Mayflower And Her Log; Azel Ames, Project Gutenberg edition.
 The Mayflower And Her Log; Azel Ames, Internet Archive edition.
 Exact arrival site of the Mayflower on Satellite Map and NOAA Chart on BlooSee
 The Mayflower II
 Contemporary photos of Plymouth's Barbican and the Mayflower Steps
 Pilgrims Point, Plymouth (UK) A photo of the modern-day Mayflower Steps Arch and Pilgrims Point
 

 
Age of Sail individual ships
English emigration
Exploration ships of England
First arrivals in the United States
History of Plymouth County, Massachusetts
History of the Thirteen Colonies
Plymouth Colony
Plymouth, Massachusetts
Pre-statehood history of Massachusetts
Ships of England